Joseph Black (1728–1799) was a Scottish physician, physicist, and chemist.

Joseph Black may also refer to:

 Joe Black (Joseph Black, 1924–2002), American baseball player
 Joseph Cofer Black (born 1950), American spy
 Joseph Laurence Black (1829–1907), Canadian politician
 Joseph Black (bowls), Scottish lawn bowler

See also
 Joe Black (disambiguation)
 Joseph Blackburn (disambiguation)